Clare Darcy was the pseudonym used by the American novelist Mary Deasy (1914–1978) for her Regency Romance novels, i.e., novels set in Regency England. She was born on May 20, 1914 in Cincinnati, Ohio, and died in Ohio in May 1978. A number of the manuscripts of her Regency novels (as well as of her other works), along with notebooks, scrapbooks, photographs, correspondence, book reviews, etc., are in the collection of the Howard Gottlieb Archival Research Center at Boston University, whose website (see link below) provides further information about the Deasy/Darcy collection.

Works published under the pseudonym Clare Darcy
Georgina (1971) 
 Cecily: Or a Young Lady of Quality (1972)
 Lydia: Or Love in Town 
 Victoire (1974)  
 Lady Pamela (1975) 
Allegra (1976)  
 Elyza (1976)  
 Regina (1976)  
 Cressida (1977)  
 Eugenia (1977)  
 Gwendolen (1978)  
 Rolande (1978)  
 Letty (1980)
 Caroline and Julia (1982)

External links and references
 Howard Gottlieb Archival Research Center - Mary Deasy (Clare Darcy)
 fantastic fiction - Clare Darcy
 book crossing - Clare Darcy

20th-century American novelists
Novelists from Ohio
1914 births
1978 deaths
American romantic fiction writers
American historical novelists
Women romantic fiction writers
American women novelists
20th-century American women writers
Women historical novelists
Writers of historical fiction set in the modern age